Koneraw is a Trans–New Guinea language spoken in West New Guinea. It was missed by classifications of Papuan languages until recently, but is clearly close to 
Mombum.

Bibliography
Word lists
Geurtjens, Hendrik. 1933. Marindineesch-Nederlandsch Woordenboek [Marind-Dutch Dictionary]. Bandoeng: Nix. (pages 397–429)
Le Roux, C. C. F. M. 1950. De Bergpapoea’s van Nieuw-Guinea en hun Woongebied [The Mountain Papuans of New Guinea and their Habitat]. Vol 2. Leiden: E. J. Brill.

References

Mombum languages
Languages of Indonesia
Languages of western New Guinea